Tadeusz Mieczysław Rybczyński (also Rybczynski; 1923–1998) was a Polish-English economist who is known for the development of the Rybczynski theorem (1955).

He studied at the London School of Economics. Soon after discovering his famous theorem, he joined Lazard and spent the rest of his career there as an investment banker.

References

1923 births
1998 deaths
British people of Polish descent
20th-century British economists
Alumni of the London School of Economics
Academics of the London School of Economics